The Embassy of the United Republic of Tanzania in Moscow is the diplomatic mission of Tanzania in the Russian Federation. It is located in embassy quarter on Bol'shaya Nikitskaja Str., house #51, that was previously occupied by the embassy of Morocco. Prior to 2013, the Tanzanian embassy was located at 33 Pyatnitskaya Street in the Zamoskvorechye District of Moscow.

The old Embassy occupied a listed memorial building - Korobkova House - built in two stages in 1890s. The oldest, northern part of the building contains a two-story core, built in 1866 and rebuilt in ornate late eclecticism by Lev Kekushev (1890-1894).  In the same decade the owners acquired an adjacent southern lot and hired Sergey Schutzmann to expand the building from Kekushev's 21×23 to 30×23 meters. The annex, completed in 1899, corresponds to the three southernmost windows on the main facade. Instead of expanding Kekushev's original artwork to the south annex, Schutzmann completely redesigned the facade, radically changing its appearance. Public sources frequently, and incorrectly, credit the building to Kekushev alone or present Kekushev's and Schutzmann's work as a joint collaboration.

For a short period following relocation of Academy of Sciences from Leningrad to Moscow (1934) the building was a residence of the Academy's Presidents Alexander Karpinsky (1935-1936) and Vladimir Komarov (1936-1945). Korobkova House was most recently renovated in 2000-2001.

See also 
 Russia–Tanzania relations
 Diplomatic missions in Russia
 Diplomatic missions of Tanzania

References

External links 

  Embassy of Tanzania in Moscow

Tanzania
Moscow
Russia–Tanzania relations
Houses completed in 1866
Houses completed in 1894
Zamoskvorechye District
Cultural heritage monuments of regional significance in Moscow